There have been several ships named Menominee

 a 1967-built bulk carrier later known as Kathryn Spirit
 the former US Navy harbour tug  of 1964
 the US Navy  USS Menominee (YTB-807) of 2011

Ship names